Itahari International College (IIC) is an information technology and business college in Sundar Haraicha Nepal, established in 2017. The college directly partners with London Metropolitan University(LondonMet) offering the honorary undergraduate degrees in BA (Hons) in Business Administration and B.Sc.(Hons) in Computing. The college is the flagship institution of Innovative Nepal Group (ING) organisation.

History 
Located in Sundar Dulari Chowk Morang ,the college was established in early 2017 with a joint venture between Islington College and Vishwa Adarsha College of Itahari.

Admission

Advanced level Qualifications (A-levels) 

 NEB passed with 2.2 CGPA (C) or above.
 Mathematics score of 2.4 GPA (C+) or above in SEE.
 English score of 2.4 GPA (C+) or above in NEB. 

Note that the applicants not meeting the aforementioned criteria for English  can do the one of the following tests:

 Pass in  General English language test given by the college or IELTS score 6.0 or PTE 53.

Academic Programmes

IT Degree (Undergraduate)

Business Degree (Undergraduate)

See also
Islington College
London Metropolitan University

References

External links 

 Official Website 

Universities and colleges in Nepal
2017 establishments in Nepal
Educational institutions established in 2017